The members of the 21st Knesset were elected on 9 April 2019.

Members of the Knesset

Replacements

References

External links
Members of the Twenty-First Knesset Knesset

 
21